The term cohort effect is used in social science to describe variations in the characteristics of an area of study (such as the incidence of a characteristic or the age at onset) over time among individuals who are defined by some shared temporal experience or common life experience, such as year of birth, or year of exposure to radiation.

Cohort effects are important to epidemiologists searching for patterns in illnesses.  Certain illnesses may be socially affected via the anticipation phenomenon, and cohort effects can be an indicator of this sort of phenomenon.

Cohort effects are important to resource dependency, and economics theorists when these groups affect structures of influence within their larger organizations. Cohorts in organizations are often defined by entry or birth date, and they retain some common characteristic (size, cohesiveness, competition) that can affect the organization. For example, cohort effects are critical issues in school enrollment. 

In order to determine whether a cohort effect is present, a researcher may conduct a cohort study.

See also

 Political socialization
 Socialization

External links
 Cohort Effects on Earnings Profiles
 Cohort effect in Lung Function among Smokers

Social research
Epidemiology
Medical statistics
Cohort study methods